A spur is a lateral ridge or tongue of land descending from a hill, mountain or main crest of a ridge. It can also be defined as another hill or mountain range which projects in a lateral direction from a main hill or mountain range. 

Examples of spurs include:
Abbott Spur, which separates the lower ends of Rutgers Glacier and Allison Glacier on the west side of the Royal Society Range in Victoria Land, Antarctica
Boott Spur, a subpeak of Mount Washington
Kaweah Peaks Ridge, a spur of the Great Western Divide, a sub-range of California's Sierra Nevada
Geneva Spur on Mount Everest
Sperrin Mountains in Northern Ireland

See also
Draw or re-entrant, the low ground between two spurs
Spur castle

References

Landforms